Ihar Tarlowski (born 21 September 1974) is a Belarusian professional football coach and former player. He is the manager of the reserves squad of FC Slutsk.

Playing career
He made his professional debut in the Belarusian Premier League in 1993 for FC Dinamo-93 Minsk.

Honours
Dinamo-93 Minsk
Belarusian Cup winner: 1994–95

Dinamo Minsk
Belarusian Premier League champion: 1997

References

1974 births
Living people
Belarusian footballers
Belarus international footballers
Belarusian expatriate footballers
Expatriate footballers in Russia
Russian Premier League players
FC Dinamo-93 Minsk players
FC Dinamo Minsk players
FC Spartak Vladikavkaz players
FC Fakel Voronezh players
FC Gomel players
FC Darida Minsk Raion players
FC Smorgon players
Belarusian football managers
Association football defenders
Association football midfielders